Randall Enrique Delgado (born February 9, 1990) is a Panamanian professional baseball pitcher who is currently a free agent. He has played in Major League Baseball (MLB) for the Atlanta Braves and Arizona Diamondbacks.

Professional career

Atlanta Braves
Delgado began the 2011 season with the AA Mississippi Braves. On June 16, 2011, the Braves announced that Delgado would be called up to make his Major League debut in a spot-start against the Texas Rangers on June 17. Delgado was given the opportunity because regular Braves starter Tommy Hanson was scratched due to right shoulder tendinitis. The debut was somewhat shaky for Delgado, as he gave up three runs (one unearned) over four innings of work, taking the loss for the game. Delgado returned to the Mississippi Braves and was later promoted to the Braves' AAA affiliate in Gwinnett. He was called up for the second time in August, once again to start in place of an injured Hanson. Facing the San Francisco Giants he pitched six hitless innings in which he faced the minimum number of batters before giving up a home run to Cody Ross to start the seventh inning and leaving the game. He received a no-decision and was optioned back to Gwinnett the next day. In 7 starts, Delgado finished 1–1 with a 2.83 ERA.

Randall's first career Major League hit came on April 22, 2012, against the Arizona Diamondbacks off of Ian Kennedy. On July 15, Delgado was optioned to Triple-A Gwinnett. In 17 starts and 1 relief appearance, Delgado finished with a record of 4–9 in 92.2 innings.

Arizona Diamondbacks
After the 2012 season, the Braves traded Delgado with Martín Prado, Nick Ahmed, Zeke Spruill and Brandon Drury to the Arizona Diamondbacks for Justin Upton and Chris Johnson. He spent the 2013 season between the minors and the Diamondbacks rotation. In 20 games, 19 starts, Delgado pitched to a 4.26 ERA in 116.1 innings while recording a record of 5–7. The following seasons after 2013 he has spent the majority of the time pitching out of the Arizona bullpen, serving as a long reliever and occasional spot starter.

In 2014, Delgado was ejected from a game against the Pittsburgh Pirates after hitting Andrew McCutchen with a fastball. There had already been warnings issued before the game after Paul Goldschmidt was hit on his hand the previous night by Ernesto Frieri. He was not suspended by MLB for the incident.

His best season came in 2015 when he pitched to a career best 3.25 ERA in 64 games. He suffered an oblique injury in spring training of 2018 and was placed on the disabled list to begin the season. He was activated off the 60 day disabled list on July 8. Delgado was designated for assignment on July 25, 2018. He was released by the organization on July 31, and later re-signed to a minor-league contract on August 18 and was assigned to the Triple-A Reno Aces. He elected free agency on October 29, 2018.

Chicago White Sox
On January 12, 2019, Delgado signed a minor league deal with the Chicago White Sox. He was released on March 20, 2019.

Kansas City T-Bones
On April 15, 2019, Delgado signed with the Kansas City T-Bones of the independent American Association.

New York Yankees
On May 24, 2019, Delgado's contract was purchased by the New York Yankees and he was assigned to the Triple-A Scranton/Wilkes-Barre RailRiders. He became a free agent following the 2019 season.

Gastonia Honey Hunters
On May 6, 2022, Delgado signed with the Gastonia Honey Hunters of the Atlantic League of Professional Baseball. He was released on September 1, 2022.

International career
Delgado was selected to represent Panama at the 2023 World Baseball Classic qualification.

Pitching style
Delgado throws five pitches: a four-seam fastball (90–93 mph), a two-seam fastball (88–91), a curveball (76–79), a changeup (79–83), and an occasional slider to right-handed hitters.

References

External links

1990 births
Living people
Atlanta Braves players
Arizona Diamondbacks players
Arizona League Diamondbacks players
Dominican Summer League Braves players
Danville Braves players
Gastonia Honey Hunters players
Gwinnett Braves players
Kansas City T-Bones players
Major League Baseball pitchers
Major League Baseball players from Panama
Mississippi Braves players
Mobile BayBears players
Myrtle Beach Pelicans players
Panamanian expatriate baseball players in the United States
Reno Aces players
Rome Braves players
Scranton/Wilkes-Barre RailRiders players
Tigres del Licey players
Panamanian expatriate baseball players in the Dominican Republic
Visalia Rawhide players
2023 World Baseball Classic players